Malvika Bansod (born 15 September 2001) is an Indian badminton player from Nagpur, Maharashtra. She has won international titles such as the Maldives and Nepal International in 2019. Bansod has won several gold medals at the national level-events in junior and senior categories.

Early life 
Bansod was born on 15 September 2001 in Nagpur, Maharashtra. She got her early education from Mother's Pet Kindergarten and Centre Point School, Amravati Road Bypass, Nagpur. She took up badminton when she was eight years old.

Career 
Bansod won titles at state championships in the Under-13 and Under-17 age groups. In 2018, after failing to qualify for the Asian Junior championships, she won two consecutive selection tournaments to represent India at the World Junior Championship in Canada. In December 2018, she was the winner at the South Asian Regional Under-21 Championship at Kathmandu Nepal, both in individual and team events. In 2019, Bansod won the All India senior ranking tournament and the All India junior ranking tournament. In the same year, she won a bronze medal at the Bulgarian Junior International Championship. In 2021, she played Austrian Open International Series but was defeated against Clara Azurmendi of Spain in the quarterfinal. In 2022, she played her first BWF Super 500 tournament at the 2022 India Open, where she beat Saina Nehwal and progressed to the quarterfinals. However, she lost in the quarterfinals to Aakarshi Kashyap. She then participated in the 2022 Syed Modi International, where she progressed to the finals. She lost in the finals in straight games to P. V. Sindhu. In the 2022 Odisha Open, she made the semi-finals, which she lost to Unnati Hooda in two close games. With her consistent results in these three tournaments, she attained a career-high world ranking of 61.

Bansod, who is a left-handed player, idolises two-time Olympics champion and five-time world champion Lin Dan of China.

Senior international debut 
She made her senior international debut in September 2019 with a title victory in the Maldives International Future Series Badminton Tournament. A week later, she won the Annapurna Post International Series, Nepal. Subsequently, she won a bronze medal at the Bahrain International Series in October 2019. She also reached the quarter final stage at the India International Challenge. With her performance in these four international tournaments in just two months, she managed to break into the world's top 200.

Awards 
Bansod has won a number of awards such as the Nag Bhushan award by a Maharashtra-based non-profit organisation, the Khelo India Talent Development Athlete award and the Target Olympic Podium Scheme (TOPS) Athlete award.

Achievements

BWF World Tour (1 runner-up) 
The BWF World Tour, which was announced on 19 March 2017 and implemented in 2018, is a series of elite badminton tournaments sanctioned by the Badminton World Federation (BWF). The BWF World Tours are divided into levels of World Tour Finals, Super 1000, Super 750, Super 500, Super 300 (part of the BWF World Tour), and the BWF Tour Super 100.

Women's singles

BWF International Challenge/Series (4 titles, 1 runner-up) 
Women's singles

  BWF International Challenge tournament
  BWF International Series tournament
  BWF Future Series tournament

References 

2001 births
Living people
Indian female badminton players
People from Nagpur
Racket sportspeople from Maharashtra
Sportswomen from Maharashtra
21st-century Indian women